Barclay is a Scottish surname (see Clan Barclay). Notable people with the surname include:

 Alexander Barclay (c. 1476–1552), Scottish poet
 Alexander Charles Barclay (1823–1893), English brewer and politician
 Alfred Richard Barclay (1859–1912), New Zealand politician
 Andrew Barclay (disambiguation), several people
 Anthony Barclay, British actor
 Arthur Barclay (1854–1938), Liberian politician
 Arthur Barclay (disambiguation), several people
 Bruce Barclay (1922–1979), New Zealand politician
 Byrna Barclay (born 1940), Canadian writer and editor
 Charles Frederick Barclay (1844–1914), American politician from Pennsylvania
 Charles James Barclay (U.S. Navy officer) (1843 – after 1905), United States Navy admiral
 Charles James Barclay (banker) (1841–1904), Australian banker
 Charles Malcolm Barclay-Harvey (1890–1969), British politician, governor of South Australia
 Chris Barclay (born 1983), American football player
 Claire Barclay (born 1968), artist
 Clifford Barclay (died 1961), Canadian politician
 Colin Barclay (born 1937), New Zealand cricketer
 Colville Barclay (diplomat) (1869–1929), British diplomat and Privy Counsellor
 Sir Colville Barclay, 14th Baronet (1913–2010), British naval officer, painter and botanist, son of the above
 Curt Barclay (1931–1985), American professional baseball player
 David Barclay (disambiguation), several people
 Sir David and Frederick Barclay (both born 1934, David died 2021), British businessmen
 Don Barclay (actor) (1892–1975), American actor
 Don Barclay (American football) (born 1989), American football offensive tackle and guard
 Eddie Barclay (born Edouard Ruault) (1921–2005), French music producer
 Edmund Barclay (1898–1961), English-Australian writer
 Edwin Barclay (1882–1955), Liberian politician
 Emily Barclay (born 1984), New Zealand actress
 Florence L. Barclay (1862–1921), British romance novelist and short story writer
 Frank Barclay (rugby league) (1887–1959), rugby league footballer who played in the 1900s and 1910s for New Zealand
 Frank Barclay (footballer), Scottish association football player of the 1950s
 George Barclay (disambiguation), several people
 Glen Barclay (1888–1959), rugby league footballer who played in the 1900s and 1910s for New Zealand Māori, and North Sydney Bears
 Henry Vere Barclay (1845–1917), English naval officer and surveyor, explorer in Australia
 Hugh Barclay (disambiguation), several people
 Humphrey Barclay (disambiguation), several people
 James Barclay (born 1965), British High Fantasy genre author
 James Turner Barclay (1807–1874), American missionary and explorer of Palestine
 James William Barclay (1832–1907), Scottish businessman, farmer and politician
 Jean-Claude Barclay (born 1942), former French international tennis player
 Jim Barclay (politician) (1882–1972), New Zealand politician
 Joan Barclay (aka Geraine Greear) (1914–2002), American film actress
 John Barclay, several people
 Joseph Barclay (1831–1881), Irish priest who was Anglican Bishop in Jerusalem
 Joseph Gurney Barclay (1816–1898), banker and astronomer
 Joseph Gurney Barclay (missionary) (1879–1976), banker and missionary 
 Kate Barclay (born 1980), Australian Olympian kayaker
 Leila Barclay, Lebanese-American storyteller and journalist
 Linwood Barclay (born 1955), Canadian-American humourist, author and former columnist
 Liz Barclay, British broadcaster, journalist and writer
 Madeleine Barclay (aka Madeleine Bayard) (1911–1943), British World War II Special Operations Executive
 Margaret Barclay (accused witch) d.1618 Irvine, Ayrshire witch trials
 Mary Barclay (1916–2008), English actress
 Max Barclay, British entomologist and museum curator
 Michael Andreas Barclay de Tolly (1761–1818), Russian field marshal
 Olivia Barclay (1919–2001), British astrologer
 Paris Barclay (born 1956), American television and film director
 Patrick Barclay, Scottish sportswriter
 Paul Barclay, Australian writer, journalist, radio presenter and producer
 Phyllis Barclay-Smith (1903–1980), British ornithologist
 Robert Barclay, several people
 Barclay baronets, several people
 Sir Roderick Barclay (1909–1996), British diplomat, ambassador to Denmark and Belgium
 Ron Barclay (1914–2003), New Zealand politician
 Sebastián Barclay (born 1978), former Argentine footballer
 Steve Barclay (racing driver) (born 1944), American race car driver
 Steve Barclay (politician) (born 1972), British politician
 Thomas Barclay (disambiguation), several people
 Vera Barclay (1893–1989), British pioneer of Scouting and author
 Violet Barclay aka Valerie Barclay and Valerie Smith (1922–2010), American illustrator
 Wally Barclay (1902–1959), New Zealand cricketer
 Walter Barclay (1899–1943), British army officer
 William Barclay, several people

Fictional characters 

 Andy Barclay, the protagonist in the first three films of the Child's Play series and Child's Play (2019 film).
 Reginald Barclay, a recurring character in Star Trek: The Next Generation and Star Trek: Voyager
.

See also
Barkley (disambiguation)
Berkeley (surname)

Scottish surnames
Surnames of Lowland Scottish origin